Porsgrunn Bridge (in Norwegian Porsgrunnsbrua) is a drawbridge constructed of concrete. It is locationed in Porsgrunn town and municipality in Vestfold og Telemark county, Norway. The bridge, which was completed in 1958, connects the eastern and western sides of Porsgrunn town center. It crosses the Porsgrunn River (in Norwegian Porsgrunnselva) a little above the point where the Skien watershed discharges into the Frierfjord. The boat traffic has an 8-meter bridge clearance.

See also 
list of bridges in Norway.

Bridges in Vestfold og Telemark
Bridges completed in 1958
1958 establishments in Norway
Buildings and structures in Porsgrunn